Magee is an Irish and Scottish surname derived from the Irish surnames Mag Aodha and O’Maolgaoithe.  It is uncommon as a given name.  Notable people with the surname include: 

 Abbie Magee (born 2000), Northern Irish football player
 Adrian Magee (born 1996), American football player
 Amos Magee (born 1971), American soccer player, coach, and front office
 Andrew Magee (1962), American golfer, only player in PGA history to have a hole-in-1 on a par 4
 Audrey Magee, Irish novelist
 Barry Magee (born 1934), New Zealand marathon runner
 Bryan Magee (1930–2019), British politician, writer and broadcaster
 Christopher Magee (politician) (1848–1901), American political boss in Pittsburgh, Pennsylvania
 Christopher Magee (fighter pilot) (1917–1995), US Marine Corps aviator
 Clare Magee (1899–1969), American politician from Missouri
 Eamonn Magee (born 1971), Irish boxer, brother of Noel and Terry
 Emily Magee (born 1965), American soprano
 Fletcher Magee (born 1996), American basketball player
 Fintan Magee (born 1985), Australian artist
 Gwendolyn Ann Magee (1943–2011), African-American fiber artist
 James McDevitt Magee (1877– 1949), American politician from Pennsylvania
 Jerry Magee (1928–2019), American journalist
 Jimmy Magee (1935–2017), Irish broadcaster
 John Alexander Magee (1827–1903), American politician from Pennsylvania
 John Gillespie Magee Jr. (1922–1941), poet and aviator
 John W. Magee (born 1848), American Medal of Honor recipient
 John Magee (disambiguation)
 Kevin Magee (motorcycle racer) (born 1962), Australian motorcycle rider
 Kevin Magee (basketball) (1959–2003), American basketball player
 Mike Magee (journalist) (born 1949), British journalist
 Mike Magee (soccer) (born 1984), American soccer player
 Noel Magee (born 1965), Irish boxer, brother of Eamonn and Terry 
 Patrick Magee (Irish republican) (born 1951), Provisional Irish Republican Army member
 Paul Magee (born 1948), Provisional Irish Republican Army member
 Rusty Magee (born 1955), American composer, lyricist, actor and comedian
 Ryan Magee, YouTube personality
 Sherry Magee (1884–1929), American baseball player
 Terrence Magee (born 1993), American football player
 Terry Magee (born 1971), Irish boxer, brother of Noel and Eamonn
 Tom Magee (born 1958), Canadian powerlifter, world's strongest man competitor and wrestler
 Tommy Magee (1899–1974), English football player
 Walter W. Magee (1862–1927), American politician from New York
 William A. Magee (1873–1938), American politician from Pennsylvania

See also
McGee (surname)

References

Surnames of Irish origin
Surnames of Scottish origin